The 2008 Cal Poly Mustangs football team represented California Polytechnic State University during the 2008 NCAA Division I FCS football season.

Cal Poly competed in the Great West Conference (GWC). The conference had previously been called the Great West Football Conference, but the new name reflected the addition of sports other than football to the conference. The 2008 Mustangs were led by eighth-year head coach Rich Ellerson and played home games at Alex G. Spanos Stadium in San Luis Obispo, California. The team finished the season as champion of the GWC, with a regular-season record of eight wins and two losses (8–2, 3–0 GWC).

At the end of the season, the Mustangs qualified for the Football Championship Subdivision (FCS) playoffs. In the first playoff game they were defeated by Weber State. That brought their final record to eight wins and three losses (8–3, 3–0 GWC). The Mustangs averaged 44 points a game, outscoring their opponents 488–292 for the season. This was the final season for Rich Ellerson as head coach. In his eight seasons the Mustangs compiled a record of 56–34, a winning percentage of .622 .

Schedule

Team players selected in the NFL Draft
The following Cal Poly Mustang players were selected in the NFL Draft.

Notes

References

Cal Poly
Cal Poly Mustangs football seasons
Great West Conference football champion seasons
Cal Poly Mustangs football